Gounghin is a department of Kouritenga Province in eastern Burkina Faso. Its capital lies at the town of Gounghin. According to the 2006 census the department has a total population of 35,257.

Towns and villages
 Gounghin (921 inhabitants) (capital)
 Balgo-Zaoce (1,164 inhabitants)
 Belembaoghin (522 inhabitants)
 Belemboulghin (1,350 inhabitants)
 Bilanghin (643 inhabitants)
 Bonsin-Dagoule (2,133 inhabitants)
 Boundoudoum-Zougo (650 inhabitants)
 Dagbilin (586 inhabitants)
 Dakonsin (696 inhabitants)
 Dapelgo (840 inhabitants)
 Dimistenga (1,529 inhabitants)
 Donsin (492 inhabitants)
 Douamtenga (765 inhabitants)
 Gandeongo-Bogodin (1,219 inhabitants)
 Godin (291 inhabitants)
 Kabèga (1,032 inhabitants)
 Kabèga-Peulh (115 inhabitants)
 Kiegtougdou (280 inhabitants)
 Koabdin (802 inhabitants)
 Kontaga (500 inhabitants)
 Kougdo (890 inhabitants)
 Lezotenga (1,993 inhabitants)
 Mendrin-Tountoghin (240 inhabitants)
 Milimtenga (222 inhabitants)
 Mossi-Balgo (250 inhabitants)
 Nalanghin (418 inhabitants)
 Namoukouka (810 inhabitants)
 Niongretenga (1,104 inhabitants)
 Nioughin (987 inhabitants)
 Nondo (394 inhabitants)
 Nougbini (247 inhabitants)
 Ouédogo-Bokin (1,407 inhabitants)
 Oueffin (818 inhabitants)
 Pilorghin (959 inhabitants)
 Pissi-Zaoce (1,791 inhabitants)
 Sampaongo (1,637 inhabitants)
 Sankouissi (245 inhabitants)
 Sitenga (467 inhabitants)
 Teyogodin (1,662 inhabitants)
 Wenibankin (553 inhabitants)
 Wobzoughin (399 inhabitants)
 Yarkanré (770 inhabitants)
 Zaka (464 inhabitants)

Demographics

References

Departments of Burkina Faso
Kouritenga Province